Events in the year 2001 in Norway.

Incumbents
 Monarch – Harald V
 Prime Minister – Jens Stoltenberg (Labour Party) until 19 October, Kjell Magne Bondevik (Christian Democratic Party)

Events

January
 26 January: Murder of Benjamin Hermansen.

February
 February – Former Prime Minister, then foreign affairs minister Thorbjørn Jagland makes a political scandal when he jokingly refers to Gabon's president Omar Bongo, due for a state visit to Norway, as "Bongo from Congo".
 February – Around 40,000 people in Oslo march in a rally to express their outrage and devastation over the racially motivated murder in Holmlia, Oslo of a young black Norwegian boy, Benjamin Hermansen at the hands of a group af neo-Nazis. Marches take place simultaneously all over Norway.

March
 25 March – The Schengen Agreement treaty comes into force in Norway.

April

May

June
 18 June – The state-owned oil and gas company Statoil is listed on the Oslo Stock Exchange.

July

August
 August – The Bratsberg Line in Nedre Telemark closes down. It was opened in 1917.
 25 August – Wedding of Haakon, Crown Prince of Norway, and Mette-Marit Tjessem Høiby.

September
 10 September – The 2001 Norwegian parliamentary election takes place. The Norwegian Labour Party won a plurality of votes and seats, closely followed by the Conservative Party. The Labour Party was unable to form a government, and a centre-right coalition of the Conservative Party, the Christian People's Party and the Liberal Party was formed, led by Norwegian Prime Minister Kjell Magne Bondevik of the Christian Democratic Party.

October
 19 October – Norwegian Prime Minister Kjell Magne Bondevik's Second Cabinet was appointed.

November
 3 November – Population Census: 4,520,900 inhabitants in Norway.
 17 November – Eurasian harvest mouse is observed in Norway for the first time.

December

Popular culture

Sports

Music 

 Norway in the Eurovision Song Contest 2001

Film

Literature
Jan Kjærstad is awarded the Nordic Council Literature Prize, for The Discoverer.

Television

Notable births
 12 January – Vilde Nilsen, Paralympic cross-country skier and biathlete
16 April – Mia Svele, handball player
14 July – Maren Grøthe, politician.

Notable deaths

17 January – Sigurd Vestad, cross country skier (born 1907)
26 January – Benjamin Hermansen, murder victim (born 1985)
29 January – Ingebrigt Davik, children's writer (born 1925)
4 February – Asbjørn Antoni Holm, politician (born 1921)
8 February – Ivo Caprino, film director and writer (born 1920)
8 February – Torkell Tande, politician (born 1901)
13 February – Knut Th. Gleditsch, sports commentator (born 1938)
14 February – Olav Reiersøl, statistician and econometrician (born 1908)
8 March – David Sandved, architect (born 1912)
11 March – Finn Ferner, sailor and Olympic silver medallist (born 1920)
22 March – Rolf Birger Pedersen, football player and coach (born 1939)
28 March – Alf Frotjold, trade unionist (born 1929)
29 March – Helge Ingstad, explorer (born 1899)
4 April – Sverre Engen, skier, ski coach, ski area manager and filmmaker in America (born 1911)
10 April – Knut Andreas Knudsen, politician (born 1919)
12 April – Reidar Hirsti, newspaper editor and politician (born 1925)
24 April – Gro Anita Schønn, singer (born 1950)
26 April – Sverre Walter Rostoft, politician and Minister (born 1912)
7 May – Thor Støre, politician (born 1924)
19 May – Vidkunn Hveding, politician and Minister (born 1921)
27 May – Knut Myrstad, politician (born 1913)
5 June – Sigmund P. Haave, politician (born 1916)
14 June – Andreas Wormdahl, politician (born 1911)
2 July – Fredrik Stabel, illustrator and satirical writer (born 2001).
15 July – Helge Rognlien, politician and Minister (born 1920)
21 July – Gudmund Grytøyr, politician (born 1920)
24 July – Sven Olsen, politician (born 1922)
31 August – Odd Steinar Holøs, politician (born 1922)
12 October – Gunnar Thorleif Hvashovd, politician (born 1924)
27 October – Ellisiv Steen, literary scholar (b. 1908).
1 November – Engly Lie, politician (born 1919)
3 November – Liv Paulsen, sprinter and shot putter (born 1925).
8 November – Alf Hellevik, philologist (born 1909).
18 November – Roar Hauglid, art historian (born 1910).
1 December – Olav Mosebekk, illustrator and painter (born 1910).
10 December – Knut Fægri, botanist (born 1909)
15 December – Leif Kolflaath, politician (born 1927)
19 December – Jakob Weidemann, painter (born 1923)
28 December – Arne Rettedal, politician and Minister (born 1926)

Full date unknown
Odd Abrahamsen, poet (born 1924)
Håkon Flood, professor of inorganic chemistry (born 1905)
Henriette Bie Lorentzen, humanist, peace activist, feminist and editor (born 1911)
Anfinn Lund, civil servant and politician (born 1926)
Nils Slaatto, architect (born 1923)

See also

References

External links

 
Norway